The 1961 U.S. Open was the 61st U.S. Open, held June 15–17 at the South Course of Oakland Hills Country Club in Birmingham, Michigan, a suburb north of Detroit. Gene Littler shot a final round 68 for 281 (+1) to win his sole major title, one stroke ahead of runners-up Bob Goalby and Doug Sanders, the 54-hole leader.

Amateur Jack Nicklaus tied for fourth at age 21, the second of his three consecutive top-4 finishes at the U.S. Open. The runner-up the previous year, he turned professional in November and won the first of four U.S. Open titles the following year. Defending champion Arnold Palmer made the cut on the number at 149 (+9), then shot even-par twice and climbed into a tie for 14th place, eight strokes behind Littler.  Four-time champion Ben Hogan also tied for 14th, the only time since 1940 that he was outside the top ten at this major. This course was the site of his third title a decade earlier in 1951, a rare successful defense. Hogan did not enter for five years and made his final U.S. Open appearances in 1966 and 1967.

The South Course previously hosted the U.S. Open in 1924, 1937, and 1951. It later hosted in 1985 and 1996, and the PGA Championship in 1972, 1979, and 2008.

Past champions in the field

Made the cut

Missed the cut

Source:

Round summaries

First round
Thursday, June 15, 1961

Source:

Second round
Friday, June 16, 1961

Source:

Third round
Saturday, June 17, 1961   (morning)

(a) denotes amateur
Source:

Final round
Saturday, June 17, 1961   (afternoon)

At the start of the final round on Saturday afternoon, Littler was at 213 (+3), three strokes behind 54-hole leader Sanders. After a 34 on the front-nine, Littler tied the lead with a birdie at 11. With a birdie at 13 combined with a Sanders bogey at the same hole, Littler was two strokes ahead. Sanders rebounded with a birdie at 16 to move within one. As Littler and Sanders reached the 18th, Goalby had already posted a 282 total, two off the pace. Littler needed no worse than bogey to get in ahead of Goalby, and that is what he shot, recording his lone bogey of the round for a 68 and a 281 total. Sanders, meanwhile, narrowly missed a birdie putt at 17, then almost chipped in for birdie at the last that would have forced a Sunday playoff. Sanders' putter cost him the championship, as he three-putted five of the last 36 greens. (He later missed a short putt to win The Open Championship in 1970.)  Littler was the only player to break par twice.

(a) denotes amateur
Source:

References

External links
USGA Championship Database
USOpen.com – 1961

U.S. Open (golf)
Golf in Michigan
Bloomfield Hills, Michigan
U.S. Open
U.S. Open (golf)
U.S. Open (golf)
U.S. Open (golf)